"Broken Lady" is a song written and recorded by American country music artist Larry Gatlin.  It was released in November 1975 as the first single from the album High Time, (also appearing as the title track of the British release of Larry Gatlin with Family & Friends) The song was Gatlin's second big hit on the Hot Country Songs chart, charting at number 5. The song won him a Grammy award in 1976 for Best Country Song.

Cover versions
The song was later covered by Dottie West for her 1978 studio album Dottie.

Chart performance

References

1975 singles
1975 songs
Larry Gatlin songs
Dottie West songs
Monument Records singles
Songs written by Larry Gatlin